Arvid Leander Andersson (9 July 1881 – 7 August 1956) was a Swedish policeman. He was the captain of the Swedish tug of war team that won the gold medal at the 1912 Summer Olympics.

References

1881 births
1956 deaths
People from Strängnäs Municipality
Tug of war competitors at the 1912 Summer Olympics
Olympic tug of war competitors of Sweden
Olympic gold medalists for Sweden
Olympic medalists in tug of war
Medalists at the 1912 Summer Olympics
20th-century Swedish people